Martin Willem Verkerk (born 31 October 1978) is a retired professional Dutch tennis player. He reached the final of the French Open in 2003 and achieved a career-high singles ranking of No. 14 in September 2003. During his career he won two ATP singles titles.

Early life 
Verkerk started playing tennis at the age of seven, playing in local tournaments and training with his parents. He played in a tennis facility in his home city of Alphen aan den Rijn, Netherlands, where his talent was discovered by local coaches, and he soon had the opportunity to train with many better players. He later won the 18 and Under Dutch title in 1995.

Career
In 2003, playing in only his third Grand Slam event and ranked 46, Verkerk reached the final of the French Open. Along the way, he beat Željko Krajan, Luis Horna, Vince Spadea and Rainer Schüttler before overcoming experienced clay court players Carlos Moyá (seeded 4th) and Guillermo Coria (seeded 7th). In the final, he lost to Spaniard Juan Carlos Ferrero in straight sets.

His unexpected run at the French Open as an underdog and his expressive on-court antics made him popular in the Netherlands. The final was watched by even more households in the Netherlands than when his countryman Richard Krajicek won Wimbledon in 1996.  However, hampered by various injuries and mononucleosis, Verkerk was unable to reproduce similar results during the rest of his career, never advancing beyond the third round in any subsequent Grand Slams.

During his career, he won two titles and reached the quarter-finals of the 2003 Rome Masters. Verkerk played a close match against Roger Federer at the 2003 Paris Masters, losing in three tiebreak sets after holding four match points.

Playing style 

Verkerk's game was based on powerful serves and backhands. He used a single-handed backhand and his favorite surface was clay.

Grand Slam finals

Singles (1 runner-up)

ATP career finals

Singles: 4 (2 titles, 2 runner-ups)

Doubles: 2 (2 runner-ups)

ATP Challenger and ITF Futures finals

Singles: 20 (10–10)

Doubles: 7 (3–4)

Performance timelines

Singles

Doubles

References

External links
 
 
 

1978 births
Living people
Dutch male tennis players
People from Leiderdorp
Sportspeople from South Holland